The Ms. Pennsylvania Senior America Pageant is a beauty pageant held in the United States. It is open to women aged 60 and older and is modeled after the Miss America Pageant, with the purpose of presenting "a positive image of aging". The event started in 1972.

References

Beauty pageants in the United States